Giorgio Goldoni (born 19 November 1954) is an Italian volleyball player. He competed in the men's tournament at the 1976 Summer Olympics.

References

1954 births
Living people
Italian men's volleyball players
Olympic volleyball players of Italy
Volleyball players at the 1976 Summer Olympics
Sportspeople from Modena